Boom Chicago is an international creative group, based in Amsterdam, Netherlands, that writes and performs sketch and improvisational comedy at their theater on the Rozengracht.

The group was founded in 1993 by Americans Andrew Moskos, Pep Rosenfeld and Ken Schaefle, who named it after their hometown and the home of improvisational (improv) comedy. 

In 1994, they moved from the Iboya on the Korte Leidsedwarsstraat to the Lijnbaansgracht in the space that later became the Sugar Factory and today Lovelee. In 1998, they took over and restored the Leidseplein Theater in the city's theater and club district. Ken Schaefle left and Saskia Maas became CEO. In 2013, the comedy show moved to their more spacious home on the Rozengracht, while the Chicago Social Club remains at the Leidseplein.

Today the group performs their own shows and hosts outside productions at their theater on the Rozengracht. The venue with three theaters also houses Boom Chicago for Business, the Boom Chicago Academy and InterActing, their program for teenagers with autism.

Boom Chicago addresses Dutch, American and world social and political issues like privacy, the role of technology, Europe, the extreme right, Pim Fortuyn, 9/11, social media, the gig economy, AI and the Metaverse. Their unique mixing of comedy styles combined with technology has been popular with audiences and critics alike. 2019's The Future is Here... And it is Slightly Annoying used AI to program a robot to improvise with the cast on stage. 

2020-21’s show was about the rediscovery of 1990’s TV comedies. And the 2022 production, Meta Luck Next Time explored the future of the Metaverse. 

Boom Chicago were the creative forces behind Comedy Central News (CCN), a news show on the Dutch Comedy Central TV for two seasons.

The group is currently owned by Moskos, Rosenfeld and Saskia Maas.

History

1993: Andrew Moskos, Pep Rosenfeld and Ken Schaefle open Boom Chicago at the Iboya, Korte Leidsedwarsstraat 41, 85 seats. Saskia Maas joins the company.

1994: Moves to Studio 100 (later the Sugar Factory, now Lovlee) on Lijnbaansgracht 238, 180 seats.

1997: Moves into the 270 seat Leidseplein Theater, the theater where Dutch legends Wim Kan, Wim Sonneveld and Toon Hermans began in the 1930s.  Boom Chicago renovates the theater, adds a kitchen, bar, and rock show sound and lighting.

2000: Hires first video director, Jamie Wright, and introduces multimedia to the shows.  Cameras are fitted in the theater (and the Leidseplein outside).  Soon green screen studios and live internet, make Boom Chicago an early pioneer with technology in a comedy show.

2002: Comedy Swap with The Second City in Chicago. The mainstage casts of The Second City and Boom Chicago perform on each other's stages in each other's cities. This was the first (and only) time a visiting comedy group plays on Second City's mainstage. All shows in both cities sell out. Key meets Peele here.

2004:  Boom Chicago Video Productions launches after the worldwide success of the Florida Voting Machine Video, where an American citizen tries to vote for Kerry, but the rigged machine only allows him to vote for George Bush.

2006:  Me, MySpace and iPod opens to best reviews to date.  Merijn Henfling, Het Parool: "Genius... We are once again grateful that [Boom Chicago] decided to make Amsterdam their home."  Peter de Bie and Francisco van Jole, TROS radio: "People are saying this is the best Boom Chicago show ever, and we would agree."  Henk van Gelder, NRC Handelsblad: "Sharp and interactive. They have created an entirely new form of theater; call it digital comedy."

First internet and mobile shows Full Frontal News (Greg Shapiro and Becky Nelson) and Slacker Fantasy Football (Michael Orton-Toliver, Brian Jack, Matt Chapman).  The Unlikely Fan (Brendan Hunt, Matt Chapman), a daily World Cup video series was featured on MSN.

2007:  Comedy Central News, begins as a daily show on Comedy Central Netherlands and runs for 75 episodes.  Highly Dubious News is nominated for a mobile content award at MIPCOM, the television conference in Cannes. "SpongeBob SquarePants in China" receives more than 22 million views on YouTube in a year, making it the number one most viewed "film and animation" YouTube video worldwide (as of April, 2009). The Chinese ambassador in the Netherlands asks Boom Chicago to remove the video due to its political content. Boom Chicago declines. By 2011, the video has been viewed more than 100 million times and (as of 2021), it is still the number one Dutch comedy video of all time.
 
2008:  15 year anniversary, April 24.  CCN returns as a weekly show in April on Comedy Central (NL). Bye-Bye Bush celebrates the end of an era.

2009:  Yankee Come Back opens the City of Amsterdam's 400 Year celebration of the Dutch settlement of New York. In the autumn, to coincide with New York's celebration the group performs Holland Globetrotters at the New Island Festival, a coproduction of de Parade, Oerol and the Netherlands Theater Institute.

2010:  Longtime fan of Boom Chicago, Maurice de Hond, makes his on stage comedy debut in Political Party. With Pep Rosenfeld, Greg Shapiro and director Andrew Moskos they create a show that combines politics, political discussion and A-list politicians who also perform in comedy scenes.

2011:  The Leidseplein Theater becomes the Chicago Social Club.  Together with club innovator Casper Reinders (Jimmy Woo) and Pieter de Koning and Joris Bakker (Bitterzoet), the venue undergoes a thorough upgrade and increases its club programming. 9/11 Forever is the only political comedy show in the world to address the ten-year anniversary of the September 11 attacks.

2012: Pep Rosenfeld speaks at TEDx Amsterdam: "Fight, Flight or Be Funny" and hosts TEDx Binnenhof where he makes fun of Prince Willem-Alexander and Princess Maxima while they are just meters away. Saskia Maas speaks at TEDx Education. With prominent roles at TED events, NEXT and Picnic, Boom Chicago has become a major player at technology, ideas and business conferences.

2013:  Boom Chicago moves from their longtime home on the Leidseplein to the (nicer) Rozentheater, where they celebrate 20 years in Amsterdam with The 7 Deadly Dutch Sins. The Chicago Social Club continues at the Leidseplein as one of Amsterdam's best club venues.

2013:  Nightmare on the Rozengracht runs during October, a 30-minute walk-through haunted house and pop up bar for adults. The show Delete Zwarte Piet Niet predicts the uproar and race controversy which would peak this year. They are among the first to propose 'roet piet' which later would become the modern compromise.

2014:  To promote What's Up With Those Beards?, Boom Chicago attempts to break the Guinness Book of World Records for most beards in one room. They only break the Dutch record.

2016:  For the first ever Dutch Correspondents' Dinner, Boom Chicago's Andrew Moskos and Wilko Terwijn help write the comedy speech for and coach Prime Minister Rutte. The political year continues with Angry White Men: Trump Up the Volume capturing and skewering the US election.

2017: Becoming just Trump Up the Volume, the show becomes one of the longest running shows at Boom Chicago. Boom Chicago renovates their second theater and launches The Upstairs Theater. Sunday Night Live take residency there and marks the return of long form improv to Boom Chicago. Pep Rosenfeld, Greg Shapiro, and director Andrew Moskos present The Year in Search, a video in partnership with Google.

2018: Andrew Moskos takes over as Artistic Director. The 25th anniversary show Bango! opens in May, starring Tamar Broadbent, Karel Ebergen, Simon Lukacs, Rhys Collier, Cene Hale, Emil Struijker-Boudier, Sacha Hoedemaker and directed by Andrew Moskos. The 25th anniversary year peaks on July 14 with two shows at Carre and the release of their book, The 25 Most Important Years in Dutch History. The Boom Chicago Academy starts teaching the FA's long-form curriculum. Escape Through the Movies, Boom Chicago's latest escape room adventure, opens at the Rozentheater. Saskia Maas launches InterActing, Boom Chicago's program for teenagers with autism.

2019: The Future is Here ...And it's Slightly Annoying! continues Boom Chicago's tradition of making technologically relevant shows including programming a robot to improvise with the cast onstage using AI (well, machine learning actually). Boom Chicago partners with Bud and the Rozentheater is a launch location for AB InBev's massive introduction of the iconic American brand in the Netherlands.

2020: While practically every other theater in the world was shut down, in April Boom Chicago produces six episodes of live comedy shows (Trump up the Volume and Going Steady) with a high quality, three-camera (socially distanced) shoot. It raised more than €10.000 in ticket sales for the actors and crew. Later in June when outdoor activities were allowed, Boom Chicago played at HEMtuin, the terrace-tival (Festivals not being allowed). Digital corporate shows became a successful new focus. 

2021: Boom Chicago creates and launches their new, expanded curriculum for The Boom Chicago Academy and launches house teams. 

2021: The first Boom Chicago Comedy Festival launches with tens of sold out shows and workshops. Alumni Seth Meyers, Jordan Peele, Kay Cannon, Colton Dunn, Josh Meyers, Ike Barinholtz and Brendan Hunt give live Q&A interviews. Arjen Lubach reunites with his old improv group Op Sterk Water. They and Shantira Jackson & Stacey Smith win the first two Bud Kings of Comedy Prizes for best festival shows.

2022: The second year of the Boom Chicago Comedy Festival doubles ticket sales. 

2022: After shooting a week in Amsterdam with Ted Lasso (including playing against Ajax), Jason Sudeikis and Brendan Hunt retake the Boom stage at a very special Shot of Improv and closing night party. 

2022: Stacey Smith takes over as artistic director.

2022: Just in time for the American midterm elections, Pep Rosenfeld and Greg Shapiro are joined by Stacey Smith, Emil Struijker-Boudier and Sacha Hoedemaker to create a show called Pep & Greg Save America. The jury is out on whether or not they actually saved it.

2023: Boom Chicago prepares for its big 30th anniversary show in the summer and launches a book with Akashic publishers for a US distribution. The Third edition of the Boom Chicago Comedy Festival (July 5-16) celebrates Boom Chicago's 30 years in Amsterdam and ten years on the Rozengracht.

Notable alumni

Seth Meyers (Late Night with Seth Meyers, Saturday Night Live) was a member of Boom Chicago in the late 1990s. He wrote, directed and starred in Boom productions in Amsterdam, Chicago, London and Edinburgh.

Oscar winner Jordan Peele (Get Out, Us, Key and Peele). His recent Nope was the New York Times Best picture of 2022.

Three Boom Chicago alumni, Jason Sudeikis, Brendan Hunt and Joe Kelly, created, wrote, starred in, and directed the Emmy award winning Ted Lasso.

Amber Ruffin, (The Amber Ruffin Show, writer for Late Night with Seth Meyers). 

Ike Barinholtz stars in, writes and produces movies and TV shows including (Mindy Project, Suicide Squad, Bad Neighbors, and The Hunt.

Kay Cannon wrote for many films, including the Pitch Perfect films. She directed a Boom filled cast in Blockers and wrote and directed a re-imagining of Cinderella for Sony in 2021.

Tami Sagher was a writer-producer for Orange is the New Black. She also writes and stars in TV shows like Inside Amy Schumer, 30 Rock, Broad City, and the (improv!) film Don't Think Twice. She is a writer-executive producer on the Hulu series Shrill.

Colton Dunn starred in the NBC sitcom Superstore during its very successful, six-year run. He wrote many of the greatest scenes on Key & Peele and, of course, he was also in Blockers.

Other successful writer-performers include Dan Oster (MADtv), Liz Cackowski (SNL) and Heather Anne Campbell (Rick and Morty), Allison Silverman (Daily Show, Colbert Report), Pete Grosz, Joe Kelly (How I Met Your Mother), Matt Jones (Breaking Bad), Suzi Barrett (Drunk History), Jessica Lowe (Wrecked), E.R. Fightmaster (Grey's Anatomy), and Carl Tart (MadTV, Party Over Here, and Brooklyn Nine-Nine).

The British mockumentary Borderline was created by Mike Orton-Toliver, and directed by Matt Jones. Greg Shapiro was Boom Chicago's anchorman on CCN, Comedy Central News (Netherlands) and Donald Trump in the world-wide Arjen Lubach viral hit America First, The Netherlands Second.

On Broadway, Nicole Parker starred with Martin Short in Fame Becomes Me in 2009 and in Wicked in 2010. Tarik Davis performed in Freestyle Love Supreme from 2019-2022 (As well as on The Amber Ruffin Show on TV). Josh Meyers (Red Oaks, The Awesomes) starred with Paul Rubens in Pee Wees Playhouse in 2010-11 and in the accompanying HBO special. Spencer Kayden co-created and starred in Urinetown in the 1990s and was nominated for a 2012 Tony award in Don't Dress for Dinner. In 2006–7, Lisa Jolley appeared in Hairspray.

Current ensemble

 Matt Castellvi
 Louie Cordon
 Simon Feilder
 Simon Lukacs
 Katie Nixon
 Raquel Palmas
 Stacey Smith (and artistic director)
 Chelsea Gill (understudy)
 Rob AndristPlourde
 Sacha Hoedemaker (musical and tech director)
 Jesse Brouwer (musician)
 Emil Struijker-Boudier (technician)
 Steve Labedz (technician)
 Andrew Moskos (co-owner)
 Pep Rosenfeld (director of creative content/co-owner)
 Saskia Maas (CEO and co-owner)

Productions
1993 
Andrew Moskos, Pep Rosenfeld, Neil McNamara, Lindley Curry, Miriam Tolan, Pam Gutteridge, Doreen Calderon + Ken Schaefle

1994 Boom / Chicago 
Andrew Moskos, Pep Rosenfeld, Pam Gutteridge, 
Emilie Beck, Josie O'Reilly, Greg Shore (Shapiro) + Ken Schaefle

1995 Great Moments in Creation/Culture Shock Therapy 
Andrew Moskos, Pep Rosenfeld, Pam Gutteridge, Greg Shore (Shapiro), Lillian Frances (née Hubscher), Tami Sagher, Scott Jones, Lesley Bevan, Sue Gillan (née Gillan) + Ken Schaefle

1996 Boom Chicago's Laatste Nieuws / Best of Boom 
Andrew Moskos, Pep Rosenfeld, Greg Shore (Shapiro), Rob AndristPlourde, Jason Meyer, Karin McKie, Lesley Bevan, Sue Gillan, Jeremy Hornik, Spencer Kayden, + Ken Schaefle + Shane Oman, + Gary Shepard, + Michael Diederich

1997 boomchicago.nl: the internet and other modern frustrations 
Andrew Moskos, Pep Rosenfeld, Greg Shore (Shapiro), Rob AndristPlourde, Pete Grosz, Seth Meyers, Phill Arensberg, Allison Silverman, Gwendolyn Druyor, Lisa Jolley, Josie O'Reilly + Ken Schaefle

1998 Think Quick 
Andrew Moskos, Pep Rosenfeld, Greg Shapiro-Shore, 
Rob AndristPlourde, Seth Meyers, Jill Benjamin, 
Holly Walker, John Stoops, Jethro Nolen, Sue Peale, Josh Meyers, Kristy Entwistle Nolen, Josie O'Reilly, + Jon Schickedanz + Steven Svymbersky

1999 Pick-ups & Hiccups 
Seth Meyers, Jill Benjamin

1999 Everything's Going to Be All Right—and Other Lies
Andrew Moskos, Greg Shore-Shapiro, Rob AndristPlourde, Holly Walker, Josh Meyers, Brendan Hunt, Ike Barinholtz, Joe Canale, Juliet Curry, Jethro Nolen, Kristy Entwistle Nolen, Dave Asher, Liz Cackowski, + Ron West, + Josie O'Reilly, + Gerbrand van Kolck + Steven Svymbersky

1999 Two Thousand Years Down the Drain: From Jesus Christ to Jerry Springer 
Andrew Moskos, Greg Shore-Shapiro, Rob AndristPlourde, Holly Walker, Josh Meyers, Brendan Hunt, Ike Barinholtz, Joe Canale, Juliet Curry, Jethro Nolen, Kristy Entwistle Nolen, Dave Asher, Liz Cackowski, + Ron West, + Josie O'Reilly, + Jon Schickedanz + Steven Svymbersky

2000 Live at the Leidseplein: Your Privacy Is Our Business (Boom Chicago is Watching Edinburgh Production)
Andrew Moskos, Greg Shapiro, Rob AndristPlourde, Dave Asher, Holly Walker, Josh Meyers, Brendan Hunt, Ike Barinholtz, Liz Cackowski, Jason Sudeikis, Kay Cannon, 
Bumper Caroll, Jennifer Bills, David Buckman, + Dave Razowsky + Jamie Wright, + Gerbrand van Kolck + Steven Svymbersky

2001 Europe:  We've Created a Monster 
Greg Shapiro, Rob AndristPlourde, Rachel Miller, Holly Walker, Josh Meyers, Brendan Hunt, Dave Asher, 
Lauren Dowden, Nicole Parker, Jordan Peele, Becky Drysdale, Joe Kelly, + Ron West, + Andrew Moskos, + Dave Buckman, + Jamie Wright, + Gerbrand van Kolck + Steven Svymbersky

2001 Ironic Yanks 
Seth Meyers, Brendan Hunt, + Andrew Moskos

2001 Nieuwjaarsconference 
Pep Rosenfeld, Greg Shapiro, + Gerbrand van Kolck + Steven Svymbersky

2002 Rock Stars 
Greg Shapiro, Rob AndristPlourde, Rachel Miller, Randall Harr, Kristi Casey, Joe Kelly, Dani Sher, Colton Dunn, Brendan Hunt, Melody Nife, Lauren Dowden, Nicole Parker, Jordan Peele, + Dave Razowsky + Pep Rosenfeld, + Andrew Moskos, + Jamie Wright, + Gerbrand van Kolck + Steven Svymbersky + Rebecca Hone

2002 Here Comes the Neighborhood (Edinburgh Production)
Brendan Hunt, Jordan Peele, + Joe Kelly, + Andrew Moskos

2002 Yankee Go Home: 
Americans and Why You Love to Hate Us 
Pep Rosenfeld, Greg Shapiro, + Andrew Moskos, + Gerbrand van Kolck + Rebecca Hone

2003 Boom Chicago Saves the World (Sorry about the Mess) 
Greg Shapiro, Rob AndristPlourde, Brendan Hunt, Jordan Peele, Colton Dunn, Dani Sher, Rachel Miller, Suzi Barrett, Heather Campbell, Jim Woods, + Pep Rosenfeld, + Andrew Moskos, + Jamie Wright, + Gerbrand van Kolck + Steven Svymbersky

2003 Going Down: A Comedy Show About Pessimism Pep Rosenfeld, Greg Shapiro, + Andrew Moskos, + Jamie Wright, + David Schmoll

2004 Why Aren't You Happy Yet?  
Greg Shapiro, Rob AndristPlourde, Rachel Miller, Suzi Barrett, Heather Campbell, Jim Woods, Tim Sniffen, Ryan Archibald, Tarik Davis, Amber Ruffin, + Pep Rosenfeld, + Andrew Moskos, + Jamie Wright, + David Schmoll, + Steven Svymbersky

2004 Mr. America Contest: A Comedy Show about the U.S. Presidential Race 
Pep Rosenfeld, Greg Shapiro, Andrew Moskos, Jamie Wright, David Schmoll

2005 Bite the Bullet! 
Suzi Barrett, Heather Campbell, Tarik Davis, Matt Jones, Amber Ruffin, Tim Sniffen, Jim Woods, + Andrew Moskos, + Pep Rosenfeld, + Greg Shapiro, + Rob AndristPlourde, + Rachel Miller, + Jamie Wright, + David Schmoll, + Steven Svymbersky

2005 Best of Boom 2005 
Ryan Archibald, Suzi Barrett, Heather Campbell, Tarik Davis, Matt Jones, Tim Sniffen, Jim Woods, + Andrew Moskos, + Pep Rosenfeld, + Greg Shapiro, + Rob AndristPlourde, + Rachel Miller, + Amber Ruffin, + Jamie Wright, + David Schmoll, + Steven Svymbersky

2006 Best of Boom 2006 
Rob AndristPlourde, Hilary Bauman, Tarik Davis, Lauren Flans, Ryan Gowland, Brian Jack, Matt Jones, Dan Oster, Greg Shapiro, + Andrew Moskos, + Pep Rosenfeld, + Laurel Coppock, + David Schmoll, + Vladimir Berkhemer + Steven Svymbersky

2006 Kick This:  A World Cup Comedy with Balls Pep Rosenfeld, Brendan Hunt, Andrew Moskos, Jamie Wright, David Schmoll

2006 Me MySpace and iPod
Hilary Bauman, Lauren Flans, Brian Jack, Matt Jones, Dan Oster + Andrew Moskos + Pep Rosenfeld + Mike Orton-Toliver, + Rob AndristPlourde, + Jennifer Burton, + Michael Diederich, + Gregory Shapiro, + Steven Svymbersky + Dave Schmoll, + Vladimir Berkhemer, + Matt Chapman, + Becky Nelson

2007 Boom Chicago's Wild West Comedy and Gun Show—Featuring One Real Indian
Jennifer Burton, Lauren Flans, Mike Orton-Toliver, Jim Woods,  Joe Kelly + Pep Rosenfeld +  Andrew Moskos + Rob AndristPlourde, + Suzi Barrett, + Hilary Bauman, + Brian Jack + Michael Diederich, + Dan Oster + Gregory Shapiro, + Steven Svymbersky + Dave Schmoll, + Vladimir Berkhemer, + Matt Chapman, + Becky Nelson

2007 Five Years in Amsterdam (Edinburgh Production) Brendan Hunt + Andrew Moskos

2008 Last One to Leave the Planet, Turn Out the Lights
Ryan Archibald, Hilary Bauman, Lauren Flans, James Kirkland, Mike Orton-Toliver, Pep Rosenfeld, David Schmoll, Steven Svymbersky, Ash Lim + Andrew Moskos, + Rob AndristPlourde, + Lolu Ajayi, + Michael Diederich, + Hans Holsen, + Gregory Shapiro, + Andel Sudik, + Julie Nichols, + Neil Towsey, + Brendan Hunt, + Matt Chapman, + Becky Nelson

2008 Screw the Planet; Save the Oil (Best of Boom 2009)
Lolu Ajayi, Ryan Archibald, Liz Bolton, Amber Ruffin, Dave Schmoll, Steven Svymbersky, Pep Rosenfeld, Shane Oman, + Andrew Moskos, + Rob AndristPlourde, + Michael Diederich, +Hans Holsen, + James Kirkland, + Mike Orton-Toliver, + Andel Sudik, + Julie Nichols, + Brian Tjon Ajong, + Neil Townsey, + Matt Chapman, + Becky Nelson

2008 Bye-Bye Bush
Pep Rosenfeld, Gregory Shapiro, Mike Orton-Toliver, Andrew Moskos, Steven Svymbersky, Julie Nichols + Matt Chapman, + Becky Nelson

2009 Yankee Come Back
Hans Holsen, Liz Bolton, Amber Ruffin, James Kirkland, Mike Orton-Toliver, Julie Nichols, Brian Tjon Ajong, Neil Townsey, Pep Rosenfeld, Shane Oman, + Andrew Moskos + Lolu Ajayi, + Rob AndristPlourde, + Michael Diederich, + Andel Sudick, + Dave Schmoll, + Steven Svymbersky, + Matt Chapman

2009 Holland Globetrotters (New York Production)
Liz Bolton, James Kirkland, Amber Ruffin, Jordan Peele, Julie Nichols, Pep Rosenfeld, Andrew Moskos, Steven Svymbersky

2009 Upgrade or Die!
Rob AndristPlourde, Liz Bolton, Amber Ruffin, James Kirkland, Brian Tjon Ajong, Neil Townsey, Dave Schmoll, Pep Rosenfeld, Shane Oman, + Andrew Moskos + Lolu Ajayi, + Michael Diederich, + Matt Chapman, + Jessica Lowe, + Steven Svymbersky

2010 Political Party
Maurice de Hond, Pep Rosenfeld, Greg Shapiro + Andrew Moskos + Brian Tjon Ajong

2010 Your Worst Fears
Lolu Ajayi, Amber Ruffin, Pep Rosenfeld, Dave Schmoll + Rob AndristPlourde, Michael Diederich + Jessica Lowe + Matt Chapman + Brian Tjon Ajong, + Shane Oman, + Andrew Moskos + Steven Svymbersky

2010 There's No Such Thing as Sinterklaas
Pep Rosenfeld, Greg Shapiro, Andrew Moskos + Brian Tjon Ajong + James Winder + Steven Svymbersky + Dave Schmoll

2011 Social Media Circus
Lolu Ajayi, Amber Ruffin, Jessica Lowe, Matt Chapman, Jim Woods, Pep Rosenfeld, Andrew Moskos, Dave Schmoll + Rob AndristPlourde, + Haley Mancini + Mike Orton-Toliver + Michael Diederich + Brian Tjon Ajong, + Shane Oman, + Steven Svymbersky

2011 9/11 Forever
Pep Rosenfeld, Greg Shapiro, Mike Orton-Toliver, Andrew Moskos + Brian Tjon Ajong + James Winder + Dave Schmoll

2012 Branded for Life
Lolu Ajayi, Cari Leslie, Drew DiFonzo Marks, Mike Orton-Toliver, Jim Woods, Pep Rosenfeld, Andrew Moskos, Dave Schmoll + Rob AndristPlourde, + Laura Chinn + Michael Diederich + Marcy Minton + Sam Super + Brian Tjon Ajong, + Shane Oman, + James Winder, + Steven Svymbersky

2012 My Big Fat American Election
Mike Orton-Toliver, Pep Rosenfeld, Greg Shapiro + Andrew Moskos, + Dave Schmoll

2012 Deep Undercover
Andrew Moskos, Mike Orton-Toliver, Pep Rosenfeld, + Michael Diederich, + Ellie Orton-Toliver + Finn Moskos + Sam Super plus other actors and citizens of Amsterdam

2013 Baby I Like It Raw
Lolu Ajayi, Cari Leslie, Jim Woods, Rob AndristPlourde, Michael Diederich, Sam Super + Pep Rosenfeld + Andrew Moskos + Dave Schmoll + Brian Tjon Ajong + Steven Svymbersky

2013 Seven Deadly Dutch Sins
Lolu Ajayi, Jim Woods, Pep Rosenfeld, Andrew Moskos + Michael Diederich + Cari Leslie + Sam Super + Brian Tjon Ajong + Steven Svymbersky

2013 20th Anniversary Best of Boom
Lolu Ajayi, Ryan Archibald, Rob AndristPlourde, Suzi Barrett, Heather Campbell, Horace Cohen, Michael Diederich, Becky Drysdale, James Kirkland, Brendan Hunt, Matt Jones, Cari Leslie, Ruben van der Meer, Andrew Moskos, Haley Mancini, Pep Rosenfeld, David Schmoll, Greg Shapiro, Sam Super, Neil Towsey, Brian Tjong Ajong, Jim Woods + Sasha Hoedemaker + Joe Kelly + Gerbrand van Kolck + Becky Nelson + Jamie Wright

2013 Nightmare on the Rozengracht (haunted house)

2013 Delete Zwarte Piet Niet
Pep Rosenfeld, Greg Shapiro, Andrew Moskos + Lolu Ajayi + Brian Tjon Ajong + Steven Svymbersky

2014 What's Up with Those Beards?
Lolu Ajayi, Ally Beardsley, Sam Super, Carl Tart, Jim Woods, + Pep Rosenfeld, + Andrew Moskos + Brian Tjon Ajong + Steven Svymbersky + Rob AndristPlourde
+ Michael Diederich
+ Eleanor Hollingsworth
+ David Schmoll

2014 Freak Circus (haunted house)

2015 New Kids on the Gracht
Lolu Ajayi, Ally Beardsley, E.R.(Emily) Fightmaster, Woody Fu, Sacha Hoedemaker, Ian Owens, Sue Gillan, Piero Procaccini, + Greg Mills, + Andrew Moskos, + Pep Rosenfeld + Brian Tjon Ajong + Steven Svymbersky

2015 Rob it Like it's Hot
Rob AndristPlourde, Michael Diederich, + Brian Tjon Ajong

2015 Escape Through Time (Escape adventure)
Andrew Moskos, Pep Rosenfeld + Rob AndristPlourde + Bobby Makariev + Finn Moskos + Isaac Simon + Tanne van der Waal + Rixt Weer

2016 Haunted Warehouse (haunted house at Roest)

2016 VR Winter Wonderland
Lolu Ajayi, Karel Ebergen, Cene Hale, Josh Rachford, Else Soelling + Jim Woods + Brian Tjon Ajong + Sacha Hoedemaker + Emil Struijker-Boudier

2016 Angry White Men: Trump Up the Volume
Pep Rosenfeld, Greg Shapiro, Andrew Moskos + Brian Tjon Ajong

2017 Facetime Your Fears
Karel Ebergen, Cene Hale, Ace Manning, Josh Rachford, Else Soelling, Jim Woods + Pep Rosenfeld, + Brian Tjon Ajong + Sacha Hoedemaker + Emil Struijker-Boudier

2017 Legends of Rob
Rob AndristPlourde, Michael Diederich, + Emil Struijker-Boudier + Sacha Hoedemaker

2017 Sunday Night Live
Karel Ebergen, Cene Hale, Ace Manning, Josh Rachford, Else Soelling, Jim Woods + Brian Tjon Ajong + Sacha Hoedemaker + Emil Struijker-Boudier

2018 Escape Through The Movies (Escape adventure)
Andrew Moskos, Pep Rosenfeld, Toan Mai (TMPRo), Rick Bon (Props), Sacha Hoedemaker (music), Emil Struijker-Boudier, Jenna Koda,

2018 Bango! Tamar Broadbent, Rhys Collier, Karel Ebergen, Cene Hale, Lizz (Biddy) Kemery, Simon Lukacs, Sacha Hoedemaker, Emil Struijker-Boudier, Andrew Moskos, Michael Orton-Toliver + Tyrone Dierksen

2018 Boom Chicago's 25th Anniversary Show at Carre Lolu Ajayi, Rob AndristPlourde, Ryan Archibald, Ike Barinholtz, Suzi Barrett, Hilary Bauman, Jill Benjamin, Dave Buckman, Liz Cackowski, Heather Campbell, Kristi Casey, Horace Cohen, Rhys Colliers, Michael Diederich, Tyrone Dierksen, Lauren Dowden, Gwendolyn Druyor, Colton Dunn, Karel Ebergen, Lauren Flans, Woody Fu, Pete Grosz, Cene Hale, Sacha Hoedemaker, Brendan Hunt, Brian Jack, Lisa Jolley, Matt Jones, Lizz (Biddy) Kemery, Jessica Lowe, Simon Lukacs, Drew DiFonzo Marks, Ruben van de Meer, Andrew Moskos, Neil McNamara, Josh Meyers, Seth Meyers, Ryan Millar, Rachel Miller, Marcy Minton, Jethro Nolen Kristy Nolen, Josie O'Reilly, Mike Orton-Toliver, Ian Owens, Pep Rosenfeld, Amber Ruffin, Greg Shapiro, Dani Sher, Jon Shickendans, Emil Struijker-Boudier, Andel Sudik, Sam Super, Holly Walker, Jamie Wright.

Plus the Extended Boom family: Tijl Beckland, Jelka van Houten, Arjen Lubach, Ruben Nicolai, Wilko Terwijn. (Ruben and Horace are in the other list!)

2019 The Future is Here... And it is Slightly Annoying Tamar Broadbent, Dave Buckman, Tyler Groce, Lizz Kemery, Simon Feilder, Simon Lukacs, Sid Singh, Andrew Moskos, Sacha Hoedemaker, Tom Clutterbuck, Emil Struijker-Boudier

2020 Sitcom Matt Castellvi, Simon Feilder, Simon Lukacs, Biddy (Lizz) Kemery, Stacey Smith, Sacha Hoedemaker, Emil Struijker-Boudier. Directed by Andrew Moskos.

2021 Boom Chicago Comedy Festival Arjen Lubach, Seth Meyers, Jordan Peele, Brendan Hunt, Shantira Jackson, Matt Castellvi, Simon Feilder, Simon Lukacs, Biddy (Lizz) Kemery, Stacey Smith, Andrew Moskos, Sacha Hoedemaker, Kay Cannon, Colton Dunn, Ike Barinholtz, Josh Meyers and many many more! Festival Director Stacey Smith.

2022 Boom Chicago into the Metaverse: Meta Luck Next Time Matt Castellvi, Simon Lukacs, Terrance Lamonte Jr., Katie Nixon, Stacey Smith, Sacha Hoedemaker, Emil Struijker-Boudier, Andrew Moskos + Simon Feilder. Directed by Sam Super.

See also
 Improvisational comedy
 List of improvisational theatre companies
 Comedy

References

External links
 Boom Chicago, official website
 

1993 establishments in the Netherlands
Dutch comedy
Culture in Amsterdam
Improvisational troupes
Performing groups established in 1993
Theatre companies in the Netherlands
Dutch comedy troupes
American comedy troupes
Comedy collectives
Trios